Root Down is a 1972 live jazz album by Jimmy Smith, released on the Verve label. It was recorded in Los Angeles on February 8, 1972. It includes the song "Root Down (And Get It)" which was sampled by the Beastie Boys for their song "Root Down."

Root Down peaked at number 24 on the Billboard Top Jazz Album charts.

Reception

AllMusic reviewer Stephen Thomas Erlewine wrote: "...the album captures a performance Smith gave with a relatively young supporting band who were clearly influenced by modern funk and rock. They push Smith to playing low-down grooves that truly cook: 'Sagg Shootin' His Arrow' and 'Root Down (And Get It)' are among the hottest tracks he ever cut...There are times where the pace slows, but the tension never sags, and the result is one of the finest, most exciting records in Smith's catalog. If you think you know everything about Jimmy Smith, this is the album for you."

Track listing
 "Sagg Shootin' His Arrow" (Jimmy Smith) – 7:09
 "For Everyone Under the Sun" (Peter Chase) – 5:56
 "After Hours" – 7:45
 "Root Down (And Get It)" (Smith) – 7:44
 "Let's Stay Together" (Al Green) – 6:30
 "Slow Down Sagg" (Smith) – 6:43

2000 remastered edition (Verve By Request series)
 "Introduction" (Hidden Track) - 2:07
 "Sagg Shootin' His Arrow" [Unedited version] – 11:45
 "For Everyone Under the Sun" – 5:55
 "After Hours" – 7:51
 "Root Down (And Get It)" [Unedited version] – 12:39
 "Let's Stay Together" – 6:27
 "Slow Down Sagg" [Unedited version] – 10:22
 "Root Down (And Get It)" [Previously unissued alternative version] – 12:13

Personnel
Jimmy Smith - Hammond B3 organ
Paul Humphrey - drums
Wilton Felder - bass guitar
Buck Clarke - congas, percussion
Arthur Adams - guitar
Steve Williams - harmonica
Reissue personnel
Hollis King - art direction
Sherniece Smith - art producer
Carlos Kase - audio supervisor, producer, research coordination
Ed Green - engineer
Jack Hunt
Mark Smith - producer, research assistant
Tom Greenwood - producer, research coordination
John Wriggle
Eric Miller - producer, supervising editor, supervising engineer
Bryan Koniarz - production coordination
Ben Young - research

References

External links
Root Down at The Incredible Jimmy Smith site

1972 live albums
Live jazz-funk albums
Jimmy Smith (musician) live albums
Verve Records live albums